This is an incomplete list of works by Claude Monet (1840–1926), including nearly all the finished paintings but excluding the Water Lilies, which can be found here, and preparatory black and white sketches.

Monet was a founder of French impressionist painting, and the most consistent and prolific practitioner of the movement's philosophy of expressing one's perceptions before nature, especially as applied to plein-air landscape painting. The term Impressionism is derived from the title of his painting Impression, Sunrise.

What made Monet different from the other Impressionist painters was his innovative idea of creating Series paintings devoted to paintings of a single theme or subject. With the repetitious study of the subject at different times of day Monet's paintings show the effects of sunlight, time and weather through color and contrast. Monet's "Series paintings" are well known and notable, and include Haystacks, Water Lilies, Rouen Cathedrals, Houses of Parliament, Charing Cross Bridge, and Poplar Trees. His prodigious output of nearly 2000 paintings was catalogued by Daniel Wildenstein.

Timeline
 1862–1871 Paris. Visits to Trouville (1870), London and Amsterdam (1871)
 1870 Marriage to Camille Doncieux.
 1871–1878 Family life in Argenteuil, near Paris. Visit to Amsterdam (1874)
 1878 Living in Paris – Birth of Michel Monet
 1878–1881 Living at Vétheuil, 60 km north-west of Paris. Visit to Fécamp.
 1879 Death of Camille
 1881–1883 Living at Poissy, 25 km north-west of Paris.
 1883 Living at Vernon, Normandy
 1883–1926 Living at his home and garden complex in Giverny, 80 km north west of Paris. Visits to Bordighera (1884), Holland (1886), Belle Île (1886), Antibes (1888), Creuse (1889), Rouen (1892, 1893, 1894), Norway (1895), London (1900), Venice (1908)
 1892 Marriage to Alice Hoschedé
 1926 Death

Works 1858–1871 (Paris, London, Amsterdam)
 For Monet's Water Lilies works see Water Lilies (Monet series)
 All works listed are classified as Painting – oil on canvas except where described otherwise.

Works 1872–1878 (Argenteuil)

Works 1878–1881 (Vétheuil)

Works 1881–1883 (Poissy)

Works 1884 (Bordighera, Italy)

Works 1884–1888 (Giverny)

Works 1888 (Antibes)

Works 1888–1898 (Giverny (continued))

Works 1899–1904 (London)
For Monet's Water Lilies see Water Lilies (Monet series)

Works 1900–1907 (Giverny (continued))
For Monet's Water Lilies see Water Lilies (Monet series)

Works 1908 Venice
For Monet's Water Lilies see Water Lilies (Monet series)

Works 1908–1926 Giverny (continued)
For Monet's Water Lilies see Water Lilies (Monet series)

Further reading

References

External links 
 

 
Monet, Claude
Lists of paintings